Charles Goring may refer to:

 Charles Goring (1743–1829), British country landowner and MP
Charles Goring (1817–1849), British Conservative politician and MP
Charles Buckman Goring (1870–1919), pioneer in criminology and author
 Charles Goring, 2nd Earl of Norwich (1615–1671), English soldier and aristocrat
 Charles Goring (cricketer), an English cricketer (1826–1840)
 Charles Goring (c. 1668–1713), an MP elected to the English Parliament in 1689